A lantern battery is a rectangular battery,  typically an alkaline or zinc-carbon primary battery, used primarily in flashlights or lanterns. Lantern batteries are physically larger and consequently offer higher capacity than the more common torch batteries. Lantern batteries comprise multiple cells inside a housing.

The most common variant in the US is the 6 volt square-base battery with spring terminals. In Europe the most common one is the 4.5 volt flat-pack.

Common variants

6 volt
The 6-volt variety typically has spring or screw terminals.  Using various internal construction styles, the same package size may be made up with "D" size or "F" size cells, offering various capacities.  A rechargeable version, comprising a three-cell sealed lead-acid battery with a lower capacity than primary versions, has also been marketed. They are also used in the construction industry for powering flashing lights at roadworks.

4.5 volt
More common in Europe and Russia, this is a smaller, flat-pack battery mostly used in flashlights. It uses two metal strips as terminals. The shorter strip is the + terminal. Marked as 3R12, 3336, KBS (Russian КБС), 3,7-FMC-0,50 (Russian 3,7-ФМЦ-0,50), and other.

7.5 volt
The 7.5-volt version has screw terminals and a rectangular base. A carrying handle is usually connected between the terminals.

12 volt
The 12-volt version has screw terminals and a rectangular base. Since it is 12-volt, this type can be used to power car accessories outside of an automobile, using extra wiring or an adapter.

Specifications and designations

See also 
 Flash light
 List of battery types

References

Battery shapes